Gerhard Olschewski (born 30 May 1942) is a German actor. He has appeared in more than 90 films and television shows since 1966. He starred in the 1976 film A Lost Life, which was entered into the 26th Berlin International Film Festival, where he won the Silver Bear for Best Actor.

Selected filmography
 A Lost Life (1976)
 Petty Thieves (1977)
  (1977)
 Der Geist der Mirabelle (1978, TV film)
  (1979)
 High Society Limited (1982)
 Nesthäkchen (1983)
  (1983)
  (1984)
 The Black Cannon Incident (1985)
 Der Landarzt (1987-2013, TV series, 241 episodes)
 Hate in the Head (1994, TV film)
 Hallo Robbie! (2001-2009, TV series, 67 episodes)

References

External links

1942 births
Living people
People from Olecko County
People from East Prussia
German male film actors
20th-century German male actors
21st-century German male actors
German male television actors
Silver Bear for Best Actor winners
German Film Award winners